Darren Coen is a former professional rugby league footballer who played in the 1980s.

Playing career

County Cup Final appearances
Coen played  in Castleford's 2-13 defeat by Hull F.C. in the 1983 Yorkshire County Cup Final during the 1983–84 season at Elland Road, Leeds, on Saturday 15 October 1983.

References

External links
Darren Coen Memory Box Search at archive.castigersheritage.com

Living people
Castleford Tigers players
Dewsbury Rams players
English rugby league players
Place of birth missing (living people)
Rugby league fullbacks
Year of birth missing (living people)